is an indoor sporting arena in  located in Ariake, Kōtō, Tokyo, Japan. It has a capacity of 10,000 and is one of the few professional tennis venues which has a retractable roof.

Events
The arena is used as the center court for the Japan Open and the Pan Pacific Open, held in Ariake Tennis Forest Park.

This venue will also host Road FC 24, instead of Ryogoku Kokugikan.

The venue also hosted the tennis events for the 2020 Summer Olympics.

In 1995, Fuji TV's hit cooking show Iron Chef held its 1995 World Cup there, with the court converted into an outdoor version of Kitchen Stadium. Iron Chef Japanese Rokusaburo Michiba won the four-person single elimination tournament to determine the best chef in the world, with the other participants being Pierre Gagnaire, Gianfranco Vissani and Xu Cheng.

This was also the homeground arena for Pro Wrestling NOAH from the year 2000 with the Destiny event. Since then, they had been doing shows actively until 2015.

See also
 List of tennis stadiums by capacity

References

External links

1987 establishments in Japan
Sports venues in Tokyo
Indoor arenas in Japan
Tennis venues in Japan
Basketball venues in Japan
Volleyball venues in Japan
Boxing venues in Japan
Venues of the 2020 Summer Olympics
Olympic tennis venues
Retractable-roof stadiums in Japan
Buildings and structures in Koto, Tokyo
Sports venues completed in 1987
Tokyo Apache